The vegueria (pl. vegueries) was the feudal administrative territorial jurisdiction of the Principality of Catalonia (to the Crown of Aragon) during the Middle Ages and into the Modern Era until the Nueva Planta decrees of 1716. The vegueria was headed by a veguer and its office was called a vigeriate.

Vegueries were also in place during the Crown of Aragon dominion of Sardinia, and –briefly– during the same in the Duchy of Athens .

History

Origins and functions
The origins of the vegueria go back to the era of the Carolingian Empire, when vicars (Latin: vicarii, singular vicarius) were installed beneath the counts in the Marca Hispanica. The office of a vicar was a vicariate (Latin: vicariatus) and his territory was a vicaria. All these Latin terms of Carolingian administration evolved in the Catalan language even as they disappeared in the rest of Europe. The Catalan terms were even subsequently Latinised: vicarius → vigerius.

The original functions of the vigeriate were feudal and it was probably initially hereditary. The veguer was appointed by his feudal lord, the count, and was accountable to him. He was the military commander of his vegueria (and thus keeper of the publicly owned castles), the chief justice of the same district, and the man in charge of the public finances (the fisc) of the region entrusted to him. As time wore on, the functions of the veguer became more and more judicial in nature. He held a cort del veguer or de la vegueria with its own seal. The cort had authority in all matter save those relating to the feudal aristocracy. It commonly heard pleas of the crown, civil, and criminal cases. The veguer did, however, retain some military functions as well: he was the commander of the militia and the superintendent of royal castles. His job was law and order and the maintenance of the king's peace: in many respects an office analogous to that of the sheriff in England.

Prime
At the end of the twelfth century in Catalonia, there were twelve vegueries. By the end of the reign of Peter the Great (1285) there were seventeen, and by the time of James the Just there were twenty one. These administrative divisions remained until 1716. Some of the larger vegueries included one or more sotsvegueries (subvigueries), which had a large degree of autonomy.

While Catalonia continued to use vegueries as subdivisions of counties, elsewhere in the Iberian peninsula there were the merináticos (Kingdom of Aragon) and the corregimientos (Kingdom of Castile) whose functions were similar to those of the Catalan vegueries.

When the Kingdom of Sicily became a Catalan-run state, it was not subdivided into vegueries, since a similar Italian institution was already entrenched there: that of the capitania and the capità. The capità had similar to identical functions as the veguer. When the Catalans conquered the Duchy of Athens, they subdivided that duchy into three vegueries: Athens, Thebes, and Livadia. In the Duchy of Neopatras which the Catalans conquered in 1319, the institution of the capità appeared instead of the vigeriate, but the captaincies (Siderokastron, Neopatras, and Salona) were similar to identical in function to the vegueries of Athens. In Athens, the offices of captain and veguer were often held by the same individual as capitaneus seu vigerius and variants. Once the Aragonese crown had finally subdued most of the Kingdom of Sardinia to their rule by the end of the fourteenth century, they had subdivided its government into vegueries. All the veguerias of the Catalan possessions were, by the Usages of Barcelona, constrained to be held for only three years by any individual, though in practice some kings ignored this. In Athens, a vicar general on the Italian model was instituted above the veguers.

Historical vegueries
Catalan vegueries have change their limits along the history and there has not always been the same number of them. Their history was terminated in 1716, when the vegueries were replaced by 12 corregimientos, a historical Castilian administrative division.

The veguerias of Catalonia at the time of James the Just were:
Tortosa
Tarragona
Montblanc
Barcelona (with Vallès sotsvegueria)
Osona
Berguedà (with Manresa sotsvegueria)
Bages (with Moianés sotsvegueria)
Vilafranca del Penedès (with Igualada and Piera sotsvegueries)
Girona
Besalú
Campodron
La Ral
Ripollès
Tàrrega
Lleida (with Balaguer sotsvegueria)
Cervera (with Agramunt and Prats del Rei sotsvegueries)
Ribagorça
Pallars
Camarasa
Rosselló (with Vallespir sotsvegueria)
Conflent (with Capcir sotsvegueria)
Cerdanya (with Ribes and Baridà sotsvegueries)

Later, during the fourteenth and fifteenth centuries, a few more vegueries were created:
Urgell
Balaguer
Agramunt
Lluçanès

Attempts to reinstate vegueries in Catalonia in modern times
Starting in 1822 Spain has been distributed into 50 provinces. The four Catalan provinces are somewhat bigger than the vegueries organization and, in modern times, there have been a few attempts to implement a smaller subdivision than that of the province, and this has been tried by means of re-instating smaller administration unit which would use the historical name of vegueria.

Despite these attempts, to date the province continues to be the building block in Catalonia.

Republican Generalitat 1931

During the brief years of the Spanish Second Republic, the Catalan autonomous government divided Catalonia into nine regions, which, in turn, were subdivided into comarques. This brief organization (as follows below) is cited as a model for the latter-day attempts to implement a smaller administration unit than that of the province:

 1st region, the capital was Barcelona and comprised the comarques: Baix Llobregat, el Barcelonès, el Maresme, Vallès Occidental and el Vallès Oriental.
 2nd region, the capital was Girona and the comarques: l'Alt Empordà, el Baix Empordà, la Garrotxa, el Gironès, and la Selva (Pla de l'Estany, newly created in 1987, was back then included in this region).
3rd region, the capital was Tarragona and the comarques: l'Alt Camp, l'Alt Penedès, el Baix Penedès, el Garraf and el Tarragonès.
 4th region, the capital was Reus and the comarques: Baix Camp, la Conca de Barberà, el Priorat and la Ribera d'Ebre.
 5th region, the capital was Tortosa and the comarques: Baix Ebre, el Montsià and la Terra Alta.
 6th region, the capital was Vic and the comarques: Baixa Cerdanya, Osona and el Ripollès.
 7th region, the capital was Manresa and the comarques: l'Anoia, el Bages, el Berguedà and el Solsonès.
 8th region, the capital was Lleida and the comarques: les Garrigues, la Noguera, l'Urgell, la Segarra and el Segrià (el Pla d'Urgell, newly created in 1987, was back then included in this region).
 9th region, the capital was Tremp and the comarques: l'Alt Urgell, el Pallars Jussà, el Pallars Sobirà and la Vall d'Aran (l'Alta Ribagorça, newly created in 1987, was back then included in this region).

Current proposals

When Franco died and Spain returned to a democratic system, the Spanish regions entered a process of intense devolution, from the central government, but also internally. In Catalonia, the comarcas were reinstated in 1987, although the veguerias have yet to be formally reclaimed.

Under the 2006 Statute of Autonomy of Catalonia, the four diputacions provincials (provincial government of the provinces) which make up Catalonia are to be superseded by seven consells de vegueries (veguerial government), which will also take over many of the functions of the comarques. As of May 2011, the final boundaries of the new vegueries have not been formally approved. They were expected to be similar to the 9 regions of the Republican Generalitat, as follows:

Àmbit metropolità de Barcelona: former 1st region, Alt Penedès and Garraf.
Alt Pirineu: former 9th region and Cerdanya, without Val d'Aran.
Camp de Tarragona: former 3rd region and 4th region.
Comarques Centrals: former 7th region and Osona. The proposed boundaries of this vegueria are contested by some.
Comarques Gironines: former 2nd and Ripollès. Also contested.
Ponent or Lleida: former 8th region.
Terres de l'Ebre: former 5th region and Ribera d'Ebre.

Some associations and town councils involved have asked for a Penedès vegueria to be created, as it was in the past (13th century — 1716). This would include the Alt Penedès, Baix Penedès, Garraf and Anoia, comarcas which the current proposal split between the Àmbit metropolità, Camp de Tarragona and Comarques Centrals. The city of Tarragona asks the government and the parliament to use the historical and official name Vegueria of Tarragona, used between the 13th century and 1716.

The previous Catalan regional government (2006–2010) hinted plans to formally re-establish the vegueries in 2011 and use them as the "building blocks" of the region.

However, the 2010 Catalan regional election produced a new legislature which has put these plans on hold.

References

Types of administrative division
Subdivisions of Catalonia
Medieval Catalonia
Principality of Catalonia